A Dadchelor party, otherwise referred to as a man shower or baby stag, is a baby shower for men. It is a celebration of the birth or expected birth of a child and the transformation of a man into a father however the focus tends to be on allowing the expectant father to have fun before the arrival of the baby. The party usually consists of gift-giving and drinking as well as other hobbies that the future father enjoys and can be organised by the father himself or his friends.

History
Earliest mentions of this 21st century concept start in the late 2000s but the trend emerged more prominently in 2011. In the years before this trend emerged, baby showers were often centered around the mothers-to-be as they were physically affected by the pregnancy and childbirth. In recent years, with improving gender equality, men have started to hold baby showers as their own form of enjoyment and celebration.

Description
The Dadchelor party is a way to celebrate first-time fathers and to provide recognition as they enter parenthood. These parties allow the father-to-be to 'let loose' before the baby is born. They consist of stereotypically masculine activities to celebrate the father-to-be's promotion to fatherhood. These parties can also be viewed as the "one last pre-fatherhood bash." Dadchelor parties can be an extensive celebration or a simple party.

Gifts
The exchange of gifts at a Dadchelor party is optional but encouraged. Other men bring gifts that will contribute to their night of bonding or even pay for the dad-to-be and his travel expenses. Gifts also are exchanged for alcoholic beverages, for example, "Chuggies for Huggies," where the guests bring diapers in exchange for alcohol.

References

Further reading
 Lewis, Michael. Home Game: An Accidental Guide to Fatherhood. Norton 2009. 
 Mactavish, Scott. The New Dad's Survival Guide: Man-to-Man Advice for First-Time Fathers. Little, Brown And Company 2005. 

Ceremonies
Fatherhood
Human pregnancy